Human Afazeli  is an Iranian football coach and former player.

Playing career
Afazeli began his extensive career in football at the age of 9, playing for Rah Ahan F.C. of Tehran. Afazeli eventually progressed to Pas F.C. of Tehran and played until earning a roster spot on the senior squad. Unfortunately, after a severe injury to his left knee in 1991, his athletic career in pro football came to an end.

Coaching career
Afazeli began his coaching career at the age of 25. His first senior job came across when he took over 1st division outfield Shahab Zanjan. During his three years with the club, he implemented 4-2-3-1 and 4-4-2 systems with flat back four which was refreshing in Iran's football dominated by the traditional 3-5-2 formation. Zanjan club produced some fluid and modern football despite limited talent and finance.

Afazali's tactical vision and practical savvy did not go unnoticed. After a friendly match between Iran national team and Shahab Zanjan in Tehran, Iran's then head coach Miroslav Ciro Blazevic, who had already guided his Croatian side to third place in the 1998 World Cup, invited Afazeli to join the national team staff as technical adviser and analyst. After Ciro departed, Afazeli stayed with the national team for four more years with newly promoted Branko Ivanković He gained a gold medal in the 2002 Asian Games, third-place finish in 2004 AFC Asian Cup, a 2006 FIFA World Cup appearance with Iran, and more than 100 international matches as an assistant and analyst for the national team. He was brought back into the national team in 2008 under new coach Ali Daei.

Afazeli stepped out alongside some coaching staff members after Ali Daei's dismissal in April 2009. He coached the team without ex-supremo Ali Daei last time against Senegal in a friendly match four days after World Cup 2010 qualifier against Saudi Arabia.

After a few months away from the limelight, he was selected as Iran football federation technical committee senior member. He refused to join Ali Daei as an assistant in Perspolis of Tehran and spoke of his desire to be a head coach again.

A few days before 2011, he became Iran U23 head coach to help the team reach London's Olympic qualification. He conducted and qualified the team for the next round in a play-off against Kyrgyzstan. Afazeli announced his resignation immediately after the second leg in Bishkek during the post-match press conference due to a "lack of support from the Iranian Olympic Committee and Football Federation of Iran." He was appointed Steel Azin's head coach on 27 June 2011. while Steel Azin was second on the table on the way to promotion to the top flight, FIFA voted to reduce 12 points out of the club due to their case with former coach Theodor Jung and his assistant. On 17 February 2012, Steel Azin and Afazeli decided to the part company due to their different views, as has been mentioned.

On 20 September 2013, the Iranian Football Federation appointed Afazeli technical director of Iran national under-23 football team, to supervise the team progress and plans for upcoming Asian Championship in Oman which is the first ever championship of the age category in Asia. He later became the manager of the team after the resignation of Ali Reza Mansourian. The team was denied with clubs releasing 18 players and Afazeli took the second team to the tournament in January 2014 in Oman without any preparation camp and friendlies with 19 players in hand. They drew Japan 3–3 in the first match, lost 1–0 against Australia in an entertaining game and beat Kuwait 3 to 1 in the last game, fail to qualify for knock out stage only by goal difference.

References

External links
Official Website 

Living people
1971 births
Iranian footballers
Pas players
Iranian football managers
Association footballers not categorized by position
Gahar Zagros F.C. managers